Charles Eugene Lancelot Brown (17 June 1863 – 2 May 1924) was a Swiss businessman and engineer who co-founded Brown, Boveri & Cie (BBC), which later became ASEA Brown Boveri.

Biography 
Brown was born on 17 June 1863 in Winterthur, canton of Zürich, as one of six children. His mother was Swiss and his father, British engineer Charles Brown (1827–1905), was the founder of Swiss Locomotive and Machine Works. He began working at Maschinenfabrik Oerlikon in 1884, where he headed the electrical engineering department from 1887 to 1891. In 1891, in collaboration with AEG, he succeeded in transmitting electric current over 175 kilometers for the International Electrotechnical Exhibition in Frankfurt, thus achieving a breakthrough in the field of alternating current. 

In 1891, Brown co-founded with Walter Boveri the company Brown, Boveri & Cie in Baden, Switzerland. Over the following decade he acquired more than thirty Swiss patents for the company. After the transformation of Brown, Boveri & Cie into a S. A., Brown chaired the board of directors from 1901 until 1911, when he broke with Boveri, left the company and retired to Montagnola in the canton of Ticino.  He died in Montagnola on 2 May 1924.

References

External links
 Scanning the Past: A History of Electrical Engineers from the Past at ieee.cincinnati.fuse.net

1863 births
1924 deaths
19th-century Swiss engineers
20th-century Swiss engineers
19th-century Swiss businesspeople
20th-century Swiss businesspeople
People from Winterthur
Brown, Boveri & Cie
Swiss people of British descent